The British 11th Aircraft Carrier Squadron  also called Eleventh Aircraft Carrier Squadron was a military formation of aircraft carriers of the Royal Navy from 1 March 1945 to December 1945.

History
The 11th Aircraft Carrier Squadron was established 1 March 1945 and assigned to the British Pacific Fleet until December 1945 when it was disbanded.

Administration

Rear-Admiral, Commanding 11th Aircraft Carrier Squadron
Included:

Composition 11th Aircraft Carrier Squadron
Included:

: 11th Aircraft Carrier Squadron; British Pacific Fleet March to  December 1945

References

Sources
 Brown, J. D. (2009). Carrier Operations in World War II. Barnsley, England: Seaforth Publishing. .
 Hobbs, David. "The Royal Navy's Pacific Strike Force | U.S. Naval Institute". www.usni.org. Naval History Magazine, Volume 27, No 1, United States Naval Institute, December 2013.
 Watson, Dr Graham. "Royal Navy Organisation and Ship Deployment 1947-2013". www.naval-history.net. Gordon Smith, 12 July 2015.

Aircraft Carrier squadrons of the Royal Navy
Military units and formations established in 1945
Military units and formations disestablished in 1945